Leonard Austen Harvey (11 July 1907 – 28 November 1976) was a British boxer. A great defensive boxer, he boxed at every weight division available at the time, from flyweight to heavyweight.  He became the light-heavyweight and heavyweight champion of the British Empire, and was recognised as world light-heavyweight champion in Britain from 1939 to 1942. Harvey was inducted into the International Boxing Hall of Fame in the class of 2008.

Early career

British middleweight champion
Born in Stoke Climsland, Cornwall, Len Harvey started out as a flyweight at 12. By the time he was 18 he was ready to fight for the British welterweight title. He was held to a draw though by Harry Mason on 29 April 1926. His next British title shot came 2 years later on 16 May 1929. This time at middleweight against Alex Ireland. Harvey knocked out his opponent in the seventh round to become British champion. He made six defences between 1929 and 1933. He also fought Marcel Thil of France for the world middleweight championship. He lost on points in a close decision. (Thil was stripped by the NBA for failing to make a title defence by August 15, 1933, but he remained the IBU champion).

British light heavyweight and heavyweight champion
On 10 April 1933, he defended his title against Jock McAvoy. This ended in defeat for Harvey but two months later he was in the ring again challenging Eddie Phillips and won on points to become British Light Heavyweight champion. On 30 November that year he beat the then unbeaten Jack Petersen to become the British Heavyweight champion. He then went on to beat Canada's Larry Gains to become British Empire champion, but lost both titles in a rematch with Petersen being stopped in the 12th round on cuts. Harvey then went on to fight for the world title on 9 November 1936, but was beaten on points by John Henry Lewis. He then regained the British Heavyweight title by disqualification against old foe Eddie Phillips. In 1936, he starred in the film, Excuse My Glove. In 1938 John Henry Lewis retired after developing eye problems, Harvey was then matched with another old foe Jock McAvoy for British recognition of the world championship at Harringay Arena. This time he won on points on 10 July 1939.

Later career and death
During the Second World War Harvey joined the Royal Air Force. He was seen in the eyes of the public as a national sporting idol and was given an officer rank. During this time he was persuaded to defend his titles against Freddie Mills on 20 June 1942. Harvey was a veteran of over a hundred bouts and was 35 years old. He was knocked out in two rounds, only the second time he was stopped and the first by K.O. He retired after this bout. He had an official record of 146 fights, 122 wins, 10 draws and 14 defeats: he claimed to have had 418 fights, but they probably included booth fights. His four fights with Jock McAvoy were legendary; he won three and lost one. He later died in Plymouth on 28 November 1976 of a heart attack relaxing at his home and commenting to his wife he was feeling ill. He was inducted into the International Boxing Hall of Fame in 2008.

Professional boxing record

See also
 List of British heavyweight boxing champions
 List of British light-heavyweight boxing champions
 List of British middleweight boxing champions

References

Further reading
Arnold, Peter History of Boxing
Hugman, Barry J. (ed.) The British Boxing Board of Control Year Book 2007
Mullan, Harry The World Encyclopedia of Boxing

External links
 
 Sparring with Len Harvey (1934) Article.

|-

|-

|-

|-

|-

People from Stoke Climsland
1907 births
1976 deaths
English male boxers
Bantamweight boxers